Eugen Sârbu (born 6 September 1950) is a Romanian-born classical violinist. He has had an international career as a soloist, recitalist and conductor (from the violin). In 1978, he won both the Paganini Competition and the Carl Flesch International Violin Competition. He has premiered works from living composers including Einojuhani Rautavaara, and has recorded Sibelius and Mozart.

Early life and education
Sârbu was born in 1950 in either Pietrari, near Râmnicu Vâlcea, or Bucharest. His sister Carmina is a pianist. He attended Galaţi music school (1957–68) and the Bucharest Conservatory (1968–70), and also studied in Paris, before moving to the United States in 1970. There he studied at the Curtis Institute of Music, Philadelphia (1970–74), and the Juilliard School, New York (1974–6). His teachers include G. Avakian and Ionel Geantă in Romania, Robert Soëtens in France, Ivan Galamian, Eugene Ormandy and Ruggiero Ricci in the United States, and Nathan Milstein in Europe.

Career
He was successful in national and international violin competitions, winning the National Festival of Music award, Bucharest (1958), the Rockefeller Prize for Music (1975), the Paganini Competition, Genoa (1978), and the Carl Flesch International Violin Competition, London (1978). He also placed joint second in the violin section of the International Competition for Musicians – West German Radios, Munich (1975), third in the International Jean Sibelius Violin Competition (1975), and seventh (1980) and ninth (1976) in the Queen Elisabeth Competition.

His first solo concert was as a child of six, and his first international concert was in Roubaix, France in 1960. He has since had an international career as a soloist. He also plays in recitals, with his sister being his duo partner. According to his entry in Groves, Sârbu's playing is characterised by "purity of intonation and clarity of tone". He plays a Stradivarius violin from 1729. He has premiered multiple works, including Einojuhani Rautavaara's Violin Concerto, which the composer dedicated to him.

In 1980, Sârbu stepped in to replace the soloist in the North Wales Festival, playing the Sibelius Violin Concerto with the BBC Welsh Symphony Orchestra conducted by Henryk Czyz. In a review for The Musical Times, A. J. Heward Rees wrote that he "played fervently though sometimes insecurely". He performed in London in 1981, playing Beethoven's Violin Concerto with the Royal Philharmonic Orchestra conducted by Antal Doráti. Geoffrey Norris, reviewing the concert for The Musical Times, criticised his interpretation, writing that it "seemed so introspective and indulgent in phrasing and tempo that it lost cohesion and became fragmented." Sârbu's Proms dėbut came the following year with the BBC Symphony Orchestra conducted by Norman Del Mar, and he also appeared at the Proms in 1983 with the same orchestra conducted by Ferdinand Leitner. In 1982, he took part in Genoa's celebration of Paganini's bicentenary. In 1984, he participated in the Ulster Festival. His performance of Walton's Violin Concerto with the BBC Philharmonic Orchestra was described by Judith Jennings in Fortnight as making "this difficult work sound deceptively easy".

Sârbu also directs from the violin, and in 1982 he became the European Master Orchestra's conductor and soloist. He has recorded Mozart as the conductor–soloist. His other notable recordings include the Sibelius Violin Concerto with the Hallé Orchestra conducted by Ole Schmidt (1981).

His honours include the George Enescu Medal (1995) and honorary membership of the Bucharest Academy of Music (1997); he was made honorary director of the Romanian National Radio Orchestra, Bucharest in 1997.

References

1950 births
Living people
Romanian emigrants to the United States
National University of Music Bucharest alumni
Curtis Institute of Music alumni
Juilliard School alumni
Romanian classical violinists
20th-century classical violinists
21st-century classical violinists
Prize-winners of the Queen Elisabeth Competition